Fereshteh Forough (born 1985) is an Afghan social activist and is the CEO and founder of Code to Inspire (CTI), the first coding school for girls in Afghanistan. She is also an advocate for gender equality and the empowerment of women in developing countries through digital literacy, education, and financial independence.

Early life and education 

Born in Iran to Afghan parents, Forough grew up a refugee. It was not until a year after the fall of the Taliban in 2001 that her family moved back to Herat, Afghanistan.  

Forough finished high school in Iran, majoring in literature. She initially had no interest in computer science, but was assigned the field after taking a college entrance exam. Her father encouraged her to give it a try, and she took his advice. She then went on to obtain her bachelor's degree in computer science from Herat University and later a master's from Technical University of Berlin in Germany.

Career 
After obtaining her master's degree and returning to Herat, Forough became a professor of computer science at Herat University, her alma mater, where she worked for almost three years. Before founding Code to Inspire in January 2015, Forough was also a co-founder and board member of Women's Annex Foundation. Now known as Digital Citizen Fund, this organization is a non-profit that teaches girls and women digital literacy and works to provide access to technology and the internet to girls in developing countries.

Code to Inspire 

Code to Inspire (CTI) opened the first all-female coding school in Afghanistan in November 2015. CTI, based in Herat, is a non-profit, one-year program. Women and girls in the program are typically between 15 and 25 years of age. Forough saw a need for an exclusively female coding school when she herself was studying and faced discrimination from male peers. She set up an IndieGoGo and was able to raise over $22,000 USD to help fund the coding school. CTI also received funding from other organizations, such as the Malala Fund and GitHub, as well as 20 laptop computers from Overstock.com. The goal in establishing CTI was to allow girls to learn valuable technological skills in a safe, comfortable environment. These girls are also able to build their resumes, which can lead to greater job opportunities after graduation. More advanced students learn how to create mobile apps and educational games, while those less experienced learn the basics of coding as well as other technological skills, such as how to use social media. In 2016, CTI was the recipient of University of California, Berkeley's CITRIS Athena "Next Generation Engagement Award." In the same year, CTI was awarded Google's RISE Award, which granted the organization $25,000 USD. Forough has voiced her desire to open new branches of Code to Inspire in other cities in Afghanistan, as well as in countries throughout the Middle East and Africa.

Advocacy 
Forough is a Peace is Loud speaker whose speaking topics include "Women and Technology: Investing in the Future," "Educating, Inspiring, and Empowering Afghan Women," "Coding for Social Change," and "Filling the Gender Gap in STEM." She gave a TED Talk in 2013 and was a 2015 Clinton Global Initiative panel speaker. She is also a mentor at Google's Made With Code, an organization which encourages girls to join STEM fields, in which they are underrepresented. 

Forough is also an advocate for the use of Bitcoin, a form of digital currency. Since PayPal is not supported in Afghanistan, and many Afghan women do not have bank accounts, she sees Bitcoin as a good way to pay Code to Inspire students for their work. She believes that working and getting paid online will enable more Afghani women to become financially independent.

Reference

 1985 births
 Living people
Afghan activists
Afghan women activists
Afghan writers
Afghan women writers
Herat University alumni
Technical University of Berlin alumni
The Game Awards winners